Isomerida albicollis is a species of beetle in the family Cerambycidae. It was described by Laporte in 1840. It is known from Brazil, French Guiana and Colombia.

References

Hemilophini
Beetles described in 1840